Herman Andrew Affel (August 4, 1893 – October 13, 1972) was an American electrical engineer who invented the modern coaxial cable.

Biography
He was born on August 4, 1893. He attended MIT. He later married Bertha May Plummer.
 
From MIT he went to work at Bell Laboratories. Among other projects he worked with Lloyd Espenschied on the characteristics of coaxial cable.  Espenschied and Affel jointly applied for a patent on a wideband coaxial cable system of transmission, filed in 1929 and granted in 1934. The invention was disclosed in a prize-winning paper published in AIEE's Electrical Engineering in October 1934.

He died on October 13, 1972.

Legacy
In 2006 Affel was inducted into the National Inventors Hall of Fame.

US Patents

 "Equalization of Carrier Transmissions," 1924, Herman A. Affel
 "Concentric Conducting System", 1929, Lloyd Espenschied and Herman A. Affel

External links
Kennelly and Affels 1916 paper
Epenschied's biography at IEEE

1893 births
1972 deaths
American electrical engineers
Scientists at Bell Labs
20th-century American engineers
20th-century American inventors
Massachusetts Institute of Technology alumni